3060 may refer to:

In general
 3060, a number in the 3000 (number) range
 A.D. 3060, a year of the 4th millennium CE
 3060 BC, a year in the 4th millennium BCE

Roads numbered 3060
 Hawaii Route 3060, a state highway
 Louisiana Highway 3060, a state highway
 Texas Farm to Market Road 3060, a state highway
 A3060 road in the UK

Other uses
 3060 Delcano, an asteroid in the Asteroid Belt, the 3060th asteroid registered

See also